Josh Primeau (born November 14, 1990) is a Canadian professional ice hockey player who is currently playing with the SC Rapperswil-Jona Lakers of the National League (NL). Primeau holds a Swiss player license which allows him to play in the National League as a non-import player.

Primeau made his National League A debut playing with Lausanne HC during the 2013–14 NLA season.

Family
Primeau is the son of the former National Hockey League (NHL) player Kevin Primeau. His younger brother Ben was the captain of the 2013-14 Fernie Ghostriders in the KIJHL.

References

External links

1990 births
Living people
HC Ajoie players
Calgary Canucks players
Canadian ice hockey left wingers
Cowichan Valley Capitals players
Lausanne HC players
Ice hockey people from Calgary
Canadian expatriate ice hockey players in Switzerland